Country Corner (Spanish: (Spanish: Rincón criollo) is a 1950 Cuban musical film directed by Raúl Medina and starring Blanquita Amaro, Néstor de Barbosa and Jose Sanabria.

Cast
 Blanquita Amaro as Rosita  
 Néstor de Barbosa as José Manuel  
 Jose Sanabria as Don Jaime 
 Carlos Pous as Pitirre  
 Paco Alfonso as Don Hilario  
 Asunción del Peso 
 José de San Antón 
 Cándita Quintana as Candelaria  
 Yeyo Arias 
 Zulema Casal as Doña Teresa  
 Viejito Bringuier as Viejito  
 Los Panchos as Themselves  
 Fernando Albuerne as himself  
 Manolo Fernández as himself 
 Rosita Díaz as herself  
 Celia Cruz as herself  
 Celina y Reutilio as Themselves 
 Paquita de Ronda as herself  
 Juan José Martínez Casado as himself 
 Ñico Saquito as himself

References

Bibliography 
 Alfonso J. García Osuna. The Cuban Filmography: 1897 through 2001. McFarland, 2003.

External links 
 

1950 films
1950s Spanish-language films
Cuban musical films
1950 musical films
Cuban black-and-white films